SURS  may refer to:
 Singapore Underground Road System, an underground road proposal in Singapore since scrapped.
 State Universities Retirement System, a government agency of the U.S. state of Illinois
 Statistični urad Republike Slovenije (Statistical Office of the Republic of Slovenia), an independent institution in charge of official statistical surveying.